Bruce H. Tiffney is an American paleobotanist, professor, and the former dean of the College of Creative Studies at the University of California, Santa Barbara.  He graduated from Boston University with a degree in geology in 1971, and after earning his PhD at Harvard University in 1977, he became a professor of biology at Yale University, where he taught for nine years, and where he also worked as a curator of the D. C. Eaton Herbarium and paleontological collections at the Peabody Museum of Natural History. His research focuses on the evolution of flowering plants (angiosperms) in the fossil record. He identified the first Cretaceous flower in the 1970s in sediment from Martha's Vineyard in the USA, but was seen as an exceptional discovery.

Tiffney is a fellow of the Geological Society of America, and appeared on the documentary series The Future Is Wild.

He is known for his wizard's hat.

References

External links
Faculty page: U.C. Santa Barbara Department of Earth Sciences
Faculty page: College of Creative studies

American paleontologists
Living people
Boston University College of Arts and Sciences alumni
Harvard University alumni
University of California, Santa Barbara faculty
Yale University faculty
Fellows of the Geological Society of America
Paleobotanists
Year of birth missing (living people)